Gurugu is a community in Sagnarigu Municipal in the Northern Region of Ghana. Its neighboring communities are Jisonaayili, Sognaayili, Kumbuyili and Chogu-Yapalsi.

It is located along the Tamale-Kumbungu road with linear settlement under the leadership of a Chief.

History
Gurugu is located in the traditional lands of the Dagomba people. It is the seat of the paramount chief of the Lingbunga and has been since Ghana's independence in 1957.

See also
Suburbs of Tamale (Ghana) metropolis

References 

Communities in Ghana
Suburbs of Tamale, Ghana